Parliamentary elections were held in Serbia on 31 May 1908. The result was a victory for the ruling People's Radical Party, which won 84 of the 160 seats in the National Assembly.

Results

References

Serbia
Parliamentary
Elections in Serbia
Serbia